The Spähpanzer SP I.C. (also known as SPIC) was the experimental model of a West German reconnaissance scout light tank with anti-tank components. It was developed from 1956 in order to increase the anti-tank capabilities of reconnaissance tank battalions, but the project eventually declined.

Specifications

See also 
Spähpanzer Ru 251
Spähpanzer Luchs
Tanks in the Cold War

Notes

References

Light tanks of Germany
Cold War tanks of Germany
Light tanks of the Cold War
Tanks with autoloaders